Amanita pseudoporphyria, also known as Hongo's false death cap, is a species of agaric fungus from the genus Amanita that grows solitarily or gregarious in coniferous forests. Originally described from Japan, it is now also known in Northern India, Thailand, and Nepal. It is quite a common species in southern China and is sold in free markets, along with the similar mushroom, Amanita manginiana. It differs only slightly by having more abundant inflated cells of its volva, and its ellipsoid to broad ellipsoid spores.

There has been a case of nephrotoxin poisoning, including delayed onset acute kidney failure associated with the ingestion of this mushroom in a 66-year-old man with diabetes. Effects occurred similar to that of the intoxication symptoms associated with the North American species Amanita smithiana and the Mediterranean Amanita proxima. Kidney biopsy of the patient showed acute tubular necrosis with glomerular minor abnormalities. Treatment included a three-week period of haemodialysis, after which the patient fully recovered from the acute kidney failure in two months.

See also
List of Amanita species

References

External links

pseudoporphyria
Fungi described in 1957
Fungi of Asia
Poisonous fungi